May refer to:

 Oltchim S.A. - a chemical company in Romania
 CS Oltchim Râmnicu Vâlcea - a women's handball club
 FC Oltchim Râmnicu Vâlcea - a defunct men's football club, dissolved in 2012.